Gladyshevo is a rural locality (a village) in Moshokskoye Rural Settlement, Sudogodsky District, Vladimir Oblast, Russia. The population was 58 as of 2010.

Geography 
Gladyshevo is located 40 km southeast of Sudogda (the district's administrative centre) by road. Kondryayevo is the nearest rural locality.

References 

Rural localities in Sudogodsky District